Morningside is a suburb to the south of Whangārei in Northland, New Zealand. Morningside railway housing settlement still substantially exists. Many of the houses have been considerably modified, but one 1939 house is protected by NZHPT Category II listing, number 7745.

Demographics

Morningside had a population of 2,340 at the 2018 New Zealand census, an increase of 273 people (13.2%) since the 2013 census, and an increase of 213 people (10.0%) since the 2006 census. There were 840 households, comprising 1,170 males and 1,170 females, giving a sex ratio of 1.0 males per female. The median age was 34.1 years (compared with 37.4 years nationally), with 495 people (21.2%) aged under 15 years, 528 (22.6%) aged 15 to 29, 1,026 (43.8%) aged 30 to 64, and 291 (12.4%) aged 65 or older.

Ethnicities were 65.9% European/Pākehā, 43.7% Māori, 5.6% Pacific peoples, 7.6% Asian, and 1.4% other ethnicities. People may identify with more than one ethnicity.

The percentage of people born overseas was 14.9, compared with 27.1% nationally.

Although some people chose not to answer the census's question about religious affiliation, 51.0% had no religion, 33.1% were Christian, 3.8% had Māori religious beliefs, 1.5% were Hindu, 0.1% were Muslim, 0.8% were Buddhist and 2.8% had other religions.

Of those at least 15 years old, 273 (14.8%) people had a bachelor's or higher degree, and 432 (23.4%) people had no formal qualifications. The median income was $25,700, compared with $31,800 nationally. 129 people (7.0%) earned over $70,000 compared to 17.2% nationally. The employment status of those at least 15 was that 885 (48.0%) people were employed full-time, 261 (14.1%) were part-time, and 96 (5.2%) were unemployed.

Culture
Terenga Parāoa Marae and Kaka Porowini meeting house are located in Morningside. The marae is affiliated with the Ngāpuhi hapū of Uri o Te Tangata.

Education
Morningside School is a coeducational contributing primary (years 1-6) school with a roll of  students as of 

Christian Renewal School is a composite state integrated co-educational secondary and primary (years 1–13) school with a roll of  students as of  Around 110 of those students are in high school (years 9–13), as of June 2018. The school was established in 1993 and integrated into the state system in 1997. The secondary half of the school is situated upstairs, and the primary downstairs. The school operates in the Christian Renewal buildings, beside the Renew Church work buildings and auditorium.

Notes

External links
 Morningside School website

Suburbs of Whangārei